Biney is a surname. Notable people with the surname include:

Ama Biney (born 1960s), British historian and journalist
Maame Biney (born 2000), American short track speedskater
Oliver Biney (born 1983), British professional wrestler 
W.H. Biney (born 1986), Ghanaian businessman